The National Center for Research on Evaluation, Standards, and Student Testing (CRESST) is a research partnership consisting of UCLA, the University of Colorado, Stanford University, RAND, the University of Pittsburgh, the University of Southern California, Educational Testing Service, and the University of Cambridge, United Kingdom.

For 50 years, the mission focus of the UCLA Center for the Study of Evaluation (CSE) and, more recently, CRESST has been the assessment of educational quality, addressing persistent problems in the design and use of assessment systems to serve multiple purposes.

History

CSE

CSE was established in 1966 when it was first designated the national center for research in educational evaluation as a result of a national competition. This charge was most recently renewed in 1996 when CSE successfully competed for the National Center for Research on Evaluation, Standards, and Student Testing (CRESST), receiving a five-year, $13.5 million grant from the U.S. Department of Education’s Office of Educational Research and Improvement (OERI). In addition to conducting research based on this core funding, CSE contracts with a wide variety of clients in the public and private sectors, including states, local school districts, foundations, and corporations. The organization’s success is documented in the demand for its research and development services: CSE’s annual budget from all sources totals over $7 million.

CRESST

Funded by the U.S. Department of Education’s Office of Educational Research and Improvement (OERI), the National Center for Research on Evaluation, Standards, and Student Testing (CRESST) is a unique partnership of UCLA’s Graduate School of Education & Information Studies and its Center for the Study of Evaluation. The CRESST mission focuses on the assessment of educational quality, addressing persistent problems in the design and use of assessment systems to serve multiple purposes.

Location 

CSE/CRESST is located on the UCLA campus in Los Angeles, CA, as part of the Graduate School of Education & Information Studies.

Staff

Directors 
Li Cai
Eva L. Baker (Founding Director)
Joan L. Herman (Emeritus Director)

Senior Researchers 

Kilchan Choi
Greg Chung
Noelle Griffin
Mark Hansen
Markus Iseli
Alan Koenig
John Lee
Ayesha Madni 
Christine Ong
Julia Phelan
Jia Wang
Bill Bewley

Research Partners 

Alison Bailey
Hilda Borko
Dan Koretz
Robert Mislevy
Harry O'Neil
Michael Seltzer
Lorrie Shepard
Brian Stecher
Noreen Webb

References

External links 
CRESST homepage
UCLA

Academic organizations based in the United States
Independent research institutes
Educational organizations based in the United States
Think tanks based in the United States
1966 establishments in the United States
Organizations established in 1966